A service wrapper is a computer program that wraps arbitrary programs thus enabling them to be installed and run as Windows Services or Unix daemons, programs that run in the background, rather than under the direct control of a user. They are often automatically started at boot time. Arbitrary programs cannot run as services or daemons, unless they fulfil specific requirements which depend on the operating system. They also have to be installed in order for the operating system to identify them as such.

Various projects exist offering a Java service wrapper, as Java itself doesn't support creating system services. Some wrappers may add additional functionality to monitor the health of the application or to communicate with it.

See also
 Windows Service
 Unix daemon

External links
 Java Service Wrapper
 Yet Another Java Service Wrapper
 Java Service Launcher
 JavaService
 Apache Commons Daemon
 FireDaemon - Run Any Application as a Windows Service
 AlwaysUp - Easily run any application as a Windows Service
 Windows Service Wrapper
 NSSM

Java platform software
Windows services